Sanjiv Ahuja is a telecommunications executive, the chairman and CEO of Tillman Global Holdings.

On 15 June 2016 his company, Apollo Towers Myanmar, began drawdowns on a $250 million loan from the United States Overseas Private Investment Corp. to build cell towers in Myanmar. The firm   hopes to build 2,000 additional towers in the country; it has already worked with Telenor, an international provider of mobile connectivity, to construct 1,700 towers in Myanmar in 2014 and 2015.

Education 

Ahuja has a degree in electrical engineering from Delhi College of Engineering, Delhi University (now Delhi Technological University), India, and a master's degree from Columbia University in New York. He lives in NYC.

Early career 

Ahuja began his career at IBM in 1979 as a software engineer. From 1987 to 1990 he managed IBM's strategy for transaction processing, and from 1990 to 1994 he was responsible for IBM's distributed network and systems business, leading IBM into the telecommunications software market globally.

After IBM, Ahuja served as the president of Telcordia Technologies (formerly Bellcore).  and led the turnaround and sale of Bellcore to SAIC. He was responsible for growing Telcordia from an RBOC-centric business to a global entity with over 40% of its sales coming from outside North America.

Ahuja's experience includes non-executive directorships of Telenor S.A. Cadbury, Williams Sonoma, Network Appliance, SAIC,

Orange and Lightsquared 

Ahuja was the chief executive officer of Orange S.A – one of the world's leading telecom operators– for three years from March 2004 – April 2007. Prior to that he was the company's chief operating officer from April 2003 to March 2004. After stepping down as CEO of Orange S.A, Sanjiv was chairman of Orange UK until September 2008.  
 
Under his leadership, Orange increased the number of countries in which it operated from 17 to 23, including 14 countries in Africa, and more than doubled its mobile customers from 48 million to over 100 million worldwide. Orange S.A also saw a significant and continuous improvement in revenue, market share and cash flow under his leadership. Sanjiv oversaw the successful extension of the Orange brand from mobile origins to embrace France Telecom's broadband, fixed line and IPTV services in its largest markets.

Ahuja founded and is the former chairman and chief executive officer of Augere, a broadband company formed in 2007  that provides wireless broadband internet services in Bangladesh and Pakistan under the brand name Qubee.

He was also the founder and chairman of Eaton Towers, which is building active and passive telecom infrastructure sharing /passive telecom infrastructure throughout Africa, with a portfolio of over 10,000 sites.

Ahuja was the chairman and CEO of LightSquared with the mission of developing the world's first wholesale-only nationwide 4G LTE Long Term Evolution wireless broadband communications network. Sanjiv partnered with Harbinger Capital Partners  CEO Philip A. Falcone in creating LightSquared following Harbinger's acquisition of Sky Terra.

Tillman Global Holdings 

TGH's initial focus was in telecommunications and technology infrastructure, and has now expanded to energy and environmental issues, with extensive global infrastructure ownership and operations expertise.

Companies in the TGH portfolio or since divested included:
• Tillman Infrastructure, a builder, operator and aggregator of US cell towers. 
• Apollo Towers,[4] the builder and operator of shared cell towers in Myanmar. 
• JC Decaux-Link, in partnership with JC Decaux, a shared small-cell infrastructure provider. 
• Eaton Telecom, a leading independent telecom tower company in Africa.

Tillman Global Holdings in 2015 inked a non-binding agreement with Reliance Communications Ltd. to acquire its tower assets in India. Due to valuation issues, the transaction had not closed as of June 2016.

Ahuja is also chairman of U.S.-based Tillman Green LLC, which in June 2016 announced a joint venture with Global Tower Solutions of the UK to provide renewable power such as solar, and battery solutions to replace diesel generation for mobile phone towers in Europe, Latin America, Africa and Asia.

References

Year of birth missing (living people)
Living people
Indian chief executives
Columbia School of Engineering and Applied Science alumni
Delhi University alumni
Delhi Technological University alumni